The county governor of Aust-Agder county in Norway represented the central government administration in the county. On 1 January 2016, the office was merged with the county governor of Vest-Agder into the county governor of Aust- og Vest-Agder in preparation for the merger of the two counties on 1 January 2020.

The diocesan county called Stavanger stiftamt was established in 1669 by the king, and it had several subordinate counties (amt) including Agdesiden amt. In 1671, Agdesiden amt was divided into Lister og Mandals amt (later called Vest-Agder) and Nedenæs amt (later called Aust-Agder). In 1682, the Stavanger stiftamt headquarters was moved to the town of Christianssand and renamed Christianssand stiftamt. The seat of Nedenæs amt was in the town of Arendal. In 1919, the county was renamed Aust-Agder. In 2020, Aust-Agder and Vest-Agder counties were merged into Agder county.

The county governor is the government's representative in the county. The governor carries out the resolutions and guidelines of the Storting and government. This is done first by the county governor performing administrative tasks on behalf of the ministries. Secondly, the county governor also monitors the activities of the municipalities and is the appeal body for many types of municipal decisions.

Names
The word for county (amt or fylke) has changed over time as has the name of the county. From 1671 until 1918, the title was Amtmann i Nedenæs amt. From 1919 until 2016, the title was Fylkesmann i Aust-Agder fylke.

List of county governors
Aust-Agder county has had the following governors:

References

Aust-Agder